The George A. Smathers Libraries of the University of Florida constitute one of the largest university library systems in the United States.  The system includes eight of the nine libraries of the University of Florida and provides primary support to all academic programs except those served by the Lawton Chiles Legal Information Center. Previously the Health Science Center Library was also separate, but it was integrated into the Smathers Libraries on July 1, 2009.  The current dean is Judith C. Russell. All of the libraries serve all of the university's faculty and students, but each has a special mission to be the primary support of specific colleges and degree programs, with Marston being the favorite library. As is common in research libraries, library materials are housed in a variety of locations depending upon discipline. The three largest libraries cover an extensive range of disciplines while the smaller libraries focus on three or fewer disciplines.

George A. Smathers Libraries and collections

Other UF library collections

Collection strengths

Together the Libraries hold 6 million+ print volumes, 1.5 million digital books, 1,000+ databases, approximately 150,000 print/digital journals, 14 million digital pages. The Libraries also administer the Florida Academic Repository (FLARE), a centralized shared print storage facility that houses millions of books from the State University System of Florida and the University of Miami.

The libraries have built a number of nationally significant research collections primarily in support of graduate research programs. Among them are collections discussed above, i.e., the Latin American Collection, the Isser and Rae Price Library of Judaica, and the Map and Imagery Library. Others include the Baldwin Library of Historical Children's Literature which is among the world's greatest collections of literature for children (Smathers Library, Special Collections); and the P.K. Yonge Library of Florida History, which is the state's preeminent Floridiana collection, holding the largest collection of Spanish colonial documents concerning southeastern United States in North America as well as rich archives of prominent Florida politicians, (Smathers Library, Special Collections).

The Libraries also have particularly strong holdings in architectural preservation and 18th century American architecture (AFA), late 19th and early 20th century German state documents from 1850–1940, Latin American art and architecture, (AFA and Smathers Library), national bibliographies (Smathers Library, Reference), U.S. Census information, especially in electronic format (Marston Science Library, Documents), the rural sociology of Florida and tropical and subtropical agriculture collections (Marston Science Library), English and American Literature, and U.S. Documents (Marston Science Library, Documents).

Benefactor

The library system was named in honor of George A. Smathers, a former Florida senator. Smathers attended the University of Florida's school of law and served as student body president. He donated approximately $20 million to the University of Florida's library system in 1991, which was at the time the largest donation to a public university in the state of Florida.

Brief History

In 1905 the University of Florida was founded in Gainesville and with it a library which, at the time, was situated within Thomas Hall. The first librarian who managed the library and its collections is recognized as C.A. Finley. In 1909 the Law Library, the Botanical Library, the Zoological Library, and the Physics Library were established. In 1910 the University of Florida’s Agricultural Library, which had previously shared its space with the Main Library in Thomas Hall, was moved to Agriculture Hall. The University of Florida’s Main Library was built in 1925 to house a growing collection of forty thousand books, numerous journals, and various documents. The fledgling library, which was constructed in the collegiate Gothic architectural style, consisted of a reference room, a reserve reading room, and offices. In 1938, for the first time, the UF Library allowed books to circulate outside the library. In 1941 the libraries automated their book circulation and fines using an IBM punch card and sorting machines. The annual meeting of the Florida Library Association was held in Gainesville in 1950. It was hosted by the Director of the UF Libraries, Stanley West. The assembly also included the inauguration of a new addition to the main library building and a donation by Marjorie Kinnan Rawlings of many of her papers and manuscripts for the creation of a Creative Writing Collection. In 1963 the libraries hit another milestone with the acquisition of their one-millionth volume. In 1967 The University of Florida’s Graduate Research Library opened (which in 1970 was to be renamed Library West), and the Main Library became the Undergraduate Library (which in 1970 was to be renamed Library East). This resulted in students and patrons alike being able, for the first time, to browse open stacks. The same year the Veterans Affairs Medical Center Library also opened. During the 1970s the UF Libraries underwent noteworthy developments in automation. This was mainly done by installing terminals with access to the bibliographic utility OCLC and other online databases, along with the acquisition of its first computer programmer, and the creations of a Systems department. The UF Libraries acquired the NOTIS software in 1980. They did so to run a PC-based, automated online card catalog and circulation system. In 1987 a new Science Library (later renamed the Marston Science Library) is opened at the University of Florida. The library was created from the merger of several science branches, including the Hume Agriculture Library.

See also
 Library West
Marston Science Library
 Smathers Library
 University of Florida Digital Collections (UFDC)
 Baldwin Library of Historical Children's Literature
 Isser and Rae Price Library of Judaica
 Lawton Chiles Legal Information Center

External links
 George A. Smathers Libraries
 Link to all of UF's libraries
 University of Florida Digital Collections (UFDC), including a statistics page that is updated as materials are loaded  
 UF Libraries History Timeline
 Smathers Libraries Campus Conversations
 Special and Area Studies Collections Blog

References

Smathers Libraries
Smathers Libraries
Smathers Libraries